Marco Tonazzi (born 28 January 1961) is an Italian former alpine skier.

Career
Tonazzi competed in FIS World Cup events during the period from 1980 to 1989. His highest World Cup finish was second place in the giant slalom at Adelboden in 1986.

References

External links
 

1961 births
Living people
Italian male alpine skiers
Universiade medalists in alpine skiing
Universiade gold medalists for Italy
Competitors at the 1985 Winter Universiade